Thomas Alfred Barton (born 11 August 1949) is an Australian politician. He was a member of the Legislative Assembly of Queensland from 1992 to 2006 as the member for Waterford.

Barton was Minister for Environment & Heritage under the Goss government from 1995 to 1996. In the first Beattie government (1998–2001) he was Minister for Police & Corrective Services; under the second Beattie government (2001–2004), Minister for State Development; and Minister for Employment, Training & Industrial Relations in the third Beattie government (2004–2006).

He was also a member of the ACTU Wages Committee from 1984 to 1992 and was a founding director of sunsuper, the largest superannuation fund in Queensland.

Barton was born in Ayr, Queensland. He is a qualified tradesman and he enjoys motor racing and rugby league.

References

1949 births
Living people
Australian Labor Party members of the Parliament of Queensland
Members of the Queensland Legislative Assembly
21st-century Australian politicians